Dolomedes vittatus is a species of nursery web spider in the family Pisauridae. It is found in the United States.

References

External links

 

Dolomedes
Articles created by Qbugbot
Spiders described in 1837